The 2010 Kelly Cup Playoffs of the ECHL began April 5, 2010.  15 teams qualified, eight from the American Conference and seven from the National Conference.  In the American conference, the winners of each of the three divisions plus the five teams with the highest point totals from the teams remaining qualified.  Due to the National Conference's membership being limited to only eight teams, the two division winners and the five teams with the highest point totals from the teams remaining qualified, with the division winner with the highest point total receiving a bye to the conference semifinals.

The conference quarterfinals will be a 2-3 format with the higher seed choosing if it wishes to host Games 1-2 or Games 3-5. Teams that are less than 350 miles apart may choose to play a 2-2-1 format.

The remaining rounds will be best-of-seven game series.

Due to a scheduling conflict with their home arena, the Alaska Aces were forced to play their home games in the National Conference quarterfinals against the Stockton Thunder at the Curtis D. Menard Memorial Sports Center in nearby Wasilla.

Playoff seeds 
After the regular season, 15 teams qualified for the playoffs.  The Idaho Steelheads were the National Conference regular season champions and the Brabham Cup winners with the best record at 103 points.  The Charlotte Checkers earned the top seed in the American Conference after winning a tiebreaker with the Kalamazoo Wings and South Carolina Stingrays after each of the three teams finished the season with 94 points each.

American Conference 
 Charlotte Checkers – South Division and American Conference regular season champions, 94 points (43 wins - South Division)
 Kalamazoo Wings – North Division champions, 94 points (42 wins)
 Elmira Jackals – East Division champions, 83 points
 South Carolina Stingrays – 94 points (41 wins - South Division)
 Cincinnati Cyclones – 91 points
 Florida Everblades – 85 points
 Reading Royals – 80 points
 Toledo Walleye – 77 points
 NOTE:  Tie-Breakers:
 South Division - Charlotte defeats South Carolina on wins (43 wins to 41 wins)
 Conference Seeding - Charlotte defeats Kalamazoo on wins (43 wins to 42 wins)

National Conference 
 Idaho Steelheads – West Division and National Conference regular season champions; Brabham Cup winners, 103 points
 Bakersfield Condors – Pacific Division champions, 81 points
 Alaska Aces – 80 points
 Utah Grizzlies – 77 points
 Las Vegas Wranglers – 76 points (34 wins)
 Stockton Thunder – 76 points (33 wins)
 Victoria Salmon Kings – 74 points

Playoff bracket

Conference Quarterfinals 
Note: Home team is listed first.

American Conference

(1) Charlotte Checkers vs. (8) Toledo Walleye

(2) Kalamazoo Wings vs. (7) Reading Royals

(3) Elmira Jackals vs. (6) Florida Everblades

(4) South Carolina Stingrays vs. (5) Cincinnati Cyclones

National Conference

(2) Bakersfield Condors vs. (7) Victoria Salmon Kings

(3) Alaska Aces vs. (6) Stockton Thunder

(4) Utah Grizzlies vs. (5) Las Vegas Wranglers

Conference semifinals 
Note: Home team is listed first.

American Conference

(1) Charlotte Checkers vs. (5) Cincinnati Cyclones

(6) Florida Everblades vs. (7) Reading Royals

National Conference

(1) Idaho Steelheads vs. (4) Utah Grizzlies

(2) Bakersfield Condors vs. (6) Stockton Thunder

Conference Finals

American Conference finals: (5) Cincinnati Cyclones vs. (7) Reading Royals

National Conference finals: (1) Idaho Steelheads vs. (6) Stockton Thunder

Kelly Cup Finals

(1) Idaho Steelheads vs (5) Cincinnati Cyclones

Statistical leaders

Skaters

These are the top ten skaters based on points.

GP = Games played; G = Goals; A = Assists; Pts = Points; +/– = Plus/minus; PIM = Penalty minutes; Yellow shade = team still in playoffs

All statistics as of: 04:04, 21 April 2010 (UTC)

Goaltending

These are the top five goaltenders based on both goals against average and save percentage with at least one game played (Note: list is sorted by goals against average).

GP = Games played; W = Wins; L = Losses; SA = Shots against; GA = Goals against; GAA = Goals against average; SV% = Save percentage; SO = Shutouts; TOI = Time on ice (in minutes); Yellow shade = team still in playoffs

All statistics as of: 04:04, 21 April 2010 (UTC)

References

See also 
 2009–10 ECHL season
 List of ECHL seasons

Kelly Cup playoffs
2009–10 ECHL season